O’Reilly Automotive, Inc. is an American auto parts retailer that provides automotive aftermarket parts, tools, supplies, equipment, and accessories to professional service providers and do-it-yourself customers. Founded in 1957 by the O’Reilly family, the company operates more than 5,600 stores in 47 states and Mexico.

History
Michael Byrne O’Reilly immigrated to America in 1849. Settling in St. Louis, he worked his way through school to earn a law degree, and then pursued a career as a title examiner.  His son, Charles Francis O’Reilly, attended college in St. Louis and went to work in 1914 as a traveling salesman for Fred Campbell Auto Supply in St. Louis. By 1924, Charles had become familiar with the Springfield area, having traveled by train to sell auto parts throughout the territory. By 1932, he had become manager of Link Motor Supply in Springfield, and one of his sons, Charles H. (Chub) O’Reilly, joined the company. Together they helped make Link Motor Supply the predominant auto parts store in the area.

In 1957, Link planned a reorganization, which included the retirement of 72-year-old Charles F. O’Reilly, and the transfer of Chub O’Reilly to Kansas City.  The two made the decision to form their own company, O’Reilly Automotive, Inc. They opened for business in Springfield, Missouri on December 2, 1957, with one store and 13 employees. Their sales totaled $700,000 in 1958—their first full year of business. By 1961, the company's volume had reached $1.3 million in combined sales volume of O’Reilly Automotive and their Ozark Automotive Distributors, a division formed to serve independent automotive jobbers in the area. In March 1975, annual sales volume rose to $7 million and a 52,000 square-foot facility was built for the O’Reilly/Ozark warehouse operation. By that time, the company had nine stores, all located in southwestern Missouri. As of March 2021, O'Reilly Automotive, Inc. operated more than 5,600 stores in 47 states, including Alaska and Hawaii and Mexico.

On April 23, 1993, the company completed an initial public stock offering, and since then trades on the NASDAQ market under the symbol ORLY. The company offers a stock purchase plan to employees in order to enable as many full-time team members as possible stock ownership in the company.

Expansion

Mergers and acquisitions
On January 30, 1998, O'Reilly merged with Hi/LO Auto Supply, adding 182 auto parts stores in Texas and Louisiana, as well as a distribution center in Houston. The Hi/LO acquisition made O’Reilly one of the top 10 auto parts chains in the country. On April 25, 2000, the firm announced the purchase of KarPro Auto Parts, which included a 66,000 square-foot distribution center in Little Rock, Arkansas, and 14 KarPro stores.

On October 1, 2001, O'Reilly purchased Mid-State Automotive Distributors, Inc., adding 82 additional auto parts stores in seven states, as well as two distribution centers. The acquisition made the firm one of the top five auto parts chains in the country. It added its eleventh distribution center in Atlanta, Georgia in March 2005.

On May 31, 2005, O'Reilly purchased Midwest Automotive Distributors, Inc., adding 72 retail locations in Minnesota, Montana, North Dakota, South Dakota, Wisconsin, and Wyoming, as well as two distribution centers located in Minnesota and Montana.

On July 11, 2008, the company completed the largest acquisition in its history with the purchase of CSK Auto, adding 1,273 stores in 12 states. This, combined with past acquisitions, made O’Reilly the third largest auto parts chain in the country after Advance Auto Parts and AutoZone.

In December 2012, O'Reilly announced it was purchasing the auto parts business of VIP Parts, Tires and Service, a Lewiston, Maine-based chain of 56 auto parts stores and service centers with locations in Maine, New Hampshire, and Massachusetts, and one distribution center in Maine. The purchase marked the firm's expansion into New England.

In August 2016, O'Reilly entered the Pittsburgh market with the acquisition of the five-store Frank's Auto Supermarket chain.

On October 26, 2016, O'Reilly announced that it was acquiring Bond Auto Parts, a 51-store chain headquartered in Vermont with locations in New Hampshire, Massachusetts, and New York as well.

On November 13, 2018, O'Reilly announced that it was acquiring Florida-based Bennett Auto Supply, a 33-store chain headquartered in Pompano Beach.

On August 20, 2019, O'Reilly Auto announced it would acquireMexico's Mayasa Auto Parts. This marked the company's first venture into international markets. Mayasa had five distribution centers, 20 company stores, and more than 2000 independent jobber locations throughout Mexico.

In late May 2020, several O'Reilly Auto parts stores were damaged by vandalism and looting during the George Floyd protests in Minneapolis–Saint Paul, with five stores being destroyed by arson.

See also

 Carquest
 National Automotive Parts Association (NAPA)
 Advance Auto Parts

References
Notes

Bibliography

External links

Automotive part retailers of the United States
Manufacturing companies based in Missouri
American companies established in 1957
Retail companies established in 1957
1957 establishments in Missouri
Companies listed on the Nasdaq
Companies based in Springfield, Missouri
1993 initial public offerings